was a  after Yōrō and before Tenpyō. This period spanned the years from February  724 through August 729.

Change of era
 724 : The previous era ended and the new one commenced in Yōrō 8, on the 4th day of the 2nd month of 724. The new era name meant "Sacred tortoise".

Events of the Jinki era
 727 (Jinki 4): The emperor sent commissioners into all the provinces to look into examine the administrations of the governors and the conduct of all public functionaries.
 728 (Jinki 5): An ambassador from Korea was received in court.

Notes

References
 Brown, Delmer M. and Ichirō Ishida, eds. (1979).  Gukanshō: The Future and the Past. Berkeley: University of California Press. ;  OCLC 251325323
 Nussbaum, Louis-Frédéric and Käthe Roth. (2005).  Japan encyclopedia. Cambridge: Harvard University Press. ;  OCLC 58053128
 Titsingh, Isaac. (1834). Nihon Ōdai Ichiran; ou,  Annales des empereurs du Japon.  Paris: Royal Asiatic Society, Oriental Translation Fund of Great Britain and Ireland. OCLC 5850691
 Varley, H. Paul. (1980). A Chronicle of Gods and Sovereigns: Jinnō Shōtōki of Kitabatake Chikafusa. New York: Columbia University Press. ;  OCLC 6042764

External links
 National Diet Library, "The Japanese Calendar" -- historical overview plus illustrative images from library's collection

Japanese eras
720s
8th century in Japan
724 beginnings
729 endings